Andrée-Anne is a French feminine given name. Notable people with this given name include:

 Andrée-Anne Côté (born 1998), Canadian synchronized swimmer
 Andrée-Anne Dupuis-Bourret, Canadian artist

See also 

 Andréanne
 André
 Andrée

French feminine given names
Compound given names
Given names
Feminine given names